Albanian Supercup 1992 is the fourth edition of the Albanian Supercup since its establishment in 1989. The match was contested between the Albanian Cup 1992 winners KS Elbasani and the 1991–92 Albanian Superliga champions KS Vllaznia.

KS Elbasani won 3-2 by extra time verdict.

Match details

See also
 1991–92 Albanian Superliga
 1991–92 Albanian Cup

References

1992
Supercup
Albanian Supercup, 1992
Albanian Supercup, 1992